Quelle strane occasioni, internationally released as Strange Occasion, is a 1976 Italian anthology comedy film directed by Luigi Comencini, Nanni Loy and Luigi Magni. Loy didn't accept to sign his segment, Italian Superman, that results directed by "Anonimo" (Anonymous).

Plot

First segment
Giobatta is an Italian immigrant in the Netherlands, who barely earns a living selling castagnaccio to the locals. While checking his pockets during a night robbery, some muggers discover Giobatta is well-endowed and take him to the owner of a nightclub, who forcibly hires him as a live sex performer. While the profits improve the livelihood of Giobatta and his unaware wife Piera, their sexual life suffers. When Piera finds out about Giobatta's moonlighting, she allows him to continue on the condition that she be the female performer. Seeing as Giobatta is too shy to perform with Piera in public, the nightclub owner demotes him to doorman and hires another male performer for Piera.

Second segment
Antonio is a man who has the taboo of sex. When his wife and daughter go on holiday, at the door of the house of Antonio knocks the beautiful Cristina, a Swedish girl, the daughter of a friend of his. Antonio begins to fall in love, and so Cristina falls in love with him too. That night the two have sex, and the day after Cristina, believing that Antonio has a very clear conception of sex, tells him that his wife made love with her father. Antonio, indignant, doesn't... welcome his wife.

Third segment
In Rome, a bishop: Ascanio, is stuck in the elevator of a building with a beautiful woman. The bishop was going to see his mistress, but now he is stuck, and then Ascanio goes having a chat with the woman about sexual matters, expressing all his indignation at the manner in which the Italians of that time approach to sex. The woman manifests sound moral principles; but at the end, when the elevator is unlocked, the contradictions of the two characters are shown.

Cast
 Paolo Villaggio: Giobatta
 Nino Manfredi: Antonio Pecoraro
 Alberto Sordi: Mons. Ascanio La Costa
 Stefania Sandrelli: Donatella
 Olga Karlatos: Giovanna
 Beba Lončar: Vedova Adami
 Valeria Moriconi: Giobatta's wife
 Jinny Steffan: Cristina

References

External links
 

1976 films
Commedia all'italiana
Films directed by Luigi Comencini
Films directed by Nanni Loy
Films directed by Luigi Magni
Films set in Rome
1976 comedy films
Films about immigration
Adultery in films
Works set in elevators
Films about clerical celibacy
1970s Italian-language films
1970s Italian films